The following highways are numbered 666:

Belgium
 The pilgrimage centre of Banneux in Belgium is located on the N666 road.

Canada
 Alberta Highway 666
 Ontario Highway 666 (former)

Ireland
  R666

Italy
  Strada regionale 666 di Sora (formerly ''strada statale 666 di Sora)

Philippines
 N666 highway (Philippines)

Sweden
 Länsväg 666, in Uppland, eastbound from Alunda.

United Kingdom
  A666 road

United States
 
 
  (former)